Margarete Garvin Gillin (1833–1915) was a painter of portraits and still lifes born in Brantford, Ontario. She studied painting in France, and moved to California in 1869, where she continued her studies at the San Francisco at the School of Design. In 1880, she moved to Hilo, Hawaii, but traveled to Hawaii's other islands to paint commissioned portraits. She returned to California in 1884, but made several more visits to Hawaii.  She died in California in 1915.

Gillin is best known for her simple, elegant and direct still lifes.  The Bishop Museum (Honolulu) and the Honolulu Museum of Art are among the public collections holding  her works.

Footnotes

1833 births
1915 deaths
Artists from Ontario
Canadian women painters
Hawaii artists
People from Brantford
19th-century American painters
20th-century American painters
19th-century Canadian painters
20th-century Canadian painters